The 2012 Pacific typhoon season was a slightly above average but destructive season, though rather active since 2004. It produced 25 named storms, fourteen typhoons, and four intense typhoons. It was an event in the annual cycle of tropical cyclone formation, in which tropical cyclones form in the western Pacific Ocean. The season ran throughout 2012, though most tropical cyclones typically develop between May and October. The season's first named storm, Pakhar, developed on March 28, while the season's last named storm, Wukong, dissipated on December 29. The season's first typhoon, Guchol, reached typhoon status on June 15, and became the first super typhoon of the year on June 17.

The scope of this article is limited to the Pacific Ocean, to the north of the equator between 100°E and the 180th meridian. Within the northwestern Pacific Ocean, there are two separate agencies that assign names to tropical cyclones, which can often result in a cyclone having two names. The Japan Meteorological Agency (JMA) will name a tropical cyclone should it be judged to have 10-minute sustained wind speeds of at least 65 km/h (40 mph) anywhere in the basin. PAGASA assigns unofficial names to tropical cyclones which move into or form as a tropical depression in their area of responsibility, located between 115°E–135°E and between 5°N–25°N, regardless of whether or not a tropical cyclone has already been given a name by the JMA. Tropical depressions that are monitored by the United States' Joint Typhoon Warning Center (JTWC) are given a numerical designation with a "W" suffix.

Seasonal forecasts

During each season, several national meteorological services and scientific agencies forecast how many tropical cyclones, tropical storms, and typhoons will form during a season and/or how many tropical cyclones will affect a particular country. These agencies include the Tropical Storm Risk (TSR) Consortium of the University College London, Philippine Atmospheric, Geophysical and Astronomical Services Administration (PAGASA) and the Taiwan's Central Weather Bureau. During previous seasons the Guy Carpenter Asia-Pacific Climate Impact Centre also issued forecasts, however they did not issue a forecast this year as it had been overestimating how many tropical cyclones would develop during the last few seasons.

On March 20, the Hong Kong Observatory predicted that the typhoon season in Hong Kong, would start in June or slightly earlier, with 5–8 tropical cyclones passing within  of the territory. The TSR Consortium subsequently released their initial forecast of the season on April 11, and predicted that the basin would see activity about 10% below the 1965–2011 average, with 25.5 tropical storms, 15.6 typhoons, 7.3 "intense" typhoons and an ACE index of about 262 units. In late April, the China Meteorological Administration's Shanghai Typhoon Institute (CMA-STI) predicted that between 22 and 25 tropical storms would develop within the basin during the year. On May 5, after a new forecast model had become available, TSR predicted that the season would now be near-normal as a new forecast model had become available as a result they raised their forecast for the number of intense typhoons to 8.5 and the ACE Index to 300 units. On May 21, the Thai Meteorological Department predicted that 1-2 tropical storms would affect Thailand during 2012. They predicted that 1 would move through Vietnam and affect Upper Thailand, during August or September, while the other one was expected to move through Southern Thailand during October or November.

In late June after six typhoons had formed Taiwan's Central Weather Bureau predicted that the season, would be near or below its average of 25.7 with 23 – 26 tropical storms occurring over the basin during 2012. Between three and five of the systems were predicted to affect Taiwan compared to an average of around 3.6. Within its July forecast update TSR increased its forecast and now predicted that the basin would see activity about 10% above the 1965–2011 average with 26.8 tropical storms, 16.7 typhoons, 9.2 "intense" typhoons and an ACE index of about 324 units. This increase was attributed to the sea surface temperatures being expected to be warmer than previously thought. Within its July — December seasonal climate outlook, PAGASA predicted that 7 — 10 tropical cyclones were likely to develop within or enter the Philippine area of responsibility between July and September, while 4 — 7 were predicted to occur between October and December. On August 6, TSR tweaked its forecast but still expected activity to be 10% above the 1965–2011 average with 27.4 tropical storms, 17.4 typhoons, 9.3 "intense" typhoons and an ACE index of about 327 units.

Season summary

The season's first named storm, Pakhar, developed on March 28 while the last named storm, Wukong, dissipated on December 29. The season became very active between mid-July and mid-August, with nine named storms formed during the period. Vicente underwent explosive intensification and made landfall over the west Pearl River Delta as a strong typhoon. Damrey developed into a typhoon in the Yellow Sea and became the most intense tropical cyclone to make landfall north of the Yangtze River since 1949. Typhoon Haikui, although centred far away from the Philippines, killed at least 89 people in the country. Typhoon Tembin affected Taiwan twice because of its cyclonic loop.

From late August to September, three very powerful typhoons, Bolaven, Sanba and Jelawat, directly hit Okinawa Island successively. In October, the remnants of Severe Tropical Storm Gaemi arrived at the Bay of Bengal and re-intensified into a deep depression before making landfall over Bangladesh. In December, Typhoon Bopha, an unusually very low-latitude but very powerful tropical cyclone, caused catastrophic damage in Mindanao in the Philippines. Bopha killed 1,901 people and cost $1.16 billion (2012 USD) in Philippines, becoming the deadliest storm worldwide in the year and the third-costliest Philippine typhoon in history, only surpassed by Typhoon Haiyan in the following season and Typhoon Rai in 2021.

Systems

Tropical Depression 01W

During that day the depression moved westwards, before the Joint Typhoon Warning Center initiated advisories at 1500 UTC and designated the system as Tropical Depression 01W. However, six hours later the JTWC issued its final advisory as vertical windshear had started to increase, and after it had found no deep convection near the systems low level circulation centre during a reassessment of the depressions low level structure. Over the next few days the JMA continued to monitor the depression before it was last noted during February 20.

Heavy rains associated with the outer bands of the system triggered widespread flooding and several landslides in the western Philippines. A total of four people were killed and another one were left injured. Overall, more than 7,500 people were affected by the storm and the economic losses stood at ₱40.1 million (US$946,000).

Tropical Storm Pakhar

On March 28, the JTWC issued a TCFA on the tropical depression, as its LLCC began to consolidate more. Early on March 29, the JMA upgraded the tropical depression to a tropical storm, and named it Pakhar, because the storm's convection had completely wrapped around the circulation center. Early on March 30, the JTWC upgraded Pakhar to a Category 1 typhoon, as a banding eye formed. Because of land interaction and colder sea surface temperatures, the JTWC downgraded Pakhar to a severe tropical storm, early on March 31. On April 1, Pakhar made landfall near Vũng Tàu, Vietnam with gusting 132 km/h, and began to weaken. Early on April 2, the JMA reported that Pakhar had weakened into a tropical depression, before they reported later that day that the system had dissipated over Cambodia.

Although Pakhar did not affect the Philippines as a tropical cyclone, its precursor produced heavy rains across part of the nation. Flooding occurred in different parts of central and southern Luzon, and the northern Visayas region. In Basud, Camarines Norte, 128 families had to be evacuated due to flash flooding. A few landslides resulted from the rains, damaging or destroying a few homes. Throughout the affected region, five people were killed and three others were listed as missing. In Vietnam, ten people were killed and several others were injured due to flash flooding and high winds. The hardest hit area was Khánh Hòa Province where the storm made landfall. About 4,400 homes were damaged in the region by the storm and thousands of acres of rice paddy were flooded. In Ho Chi Minh City, officials reported that 600 homes and schools were destroyed. Total damage were finalized at ₫1.12 trillion (US$53.9 million). The remnants of the system brought rains to parts of Cambodia, Laos, and Thailand.

Severe Tropical Storm Sanvu

 Late on May 27, the JMA reported that Sanvu had degenerated into an extratropical low, before the remnants dissipated during May 30.

However the only damage reported was on Guam where falling tree limbs caused an estimated $20,000 of damage to power lines.

Typhoon Mawar (Ambo)

On May 29, a tropical disturbance formed northwest of Palau. On May 30, the disturbance began moving northwestwards, as it slowly strengthened. On May 31, the system's convection became significantly organized near Samar prompting the JTWC to issue a TCFA. Later that day, the PAGASA upgraded the low-pressure area to a tropical depression and assigned its local name Ambo, and the JTWC upgraded the disturbance into a tropical depression. On June 1, the JMA upgraded the system to a tropical storm and named it Mawar. On June 2, the JMA upgraded Mawar to a severe tropical storm, and the JTWC upgraded it to a category 1 typhoon as the convection began to wrap up and organize. On June 3, the JMA upgraded Mawar to a typhoon after the JTWC upgraded it to a category 2 typhoon. Early on June 4, the JTWC upgraded Mawar to a category 3 typhoon but downgraded it to a category 2 typhoon only six hours later, due to increasing wind shear coming from a subtropical jet stream located over Japan. On June 5, Mawar started its extratropical transition, and the JMA downgraded Mawar to a severe tropical storm. On June 6, Mawar fully became extratropical cyclone and dissipated east of the Kamchatka Peninsula on June 13.

Mawar brought torrential rain to parts of the Philippines including the Bicol Region while enhancing the southwest monsoon which triggered delays and cancelled of air flights. In Bicol region, more than 332 passengers were stranded at ports due to Mawar. Different domestic and international flights were forced to divert at Clark Air Base rather than NAIA due to bad weather. Some other flights were also cancelled. At least three were reported dead due to rains brought by Mawar.

Typhoon Guchol (Butchoy)

Between June 14 and 18, Guchol enhanced the southwestern monsoon over the Philippines, resulting in widespread rains. However, the effects of these rains were limited and only one fatality took place. In Japan, airlines cancelled 420 domestic and international flights because of the strong winds, affecting 32,600 passengers. The town of Nachikatsuura, some 400 kilometres southwest of Tokyo, ordered nearly 1,600 residents to evacuate, warning of the danger of landslides brought on by heavy rain, media reports said. At least two people were killed and eighty others were injured across the country. Total economic losses were estimated in excess of ¥8 billion (US$100 million).

Severe Tropical Storm Talim (Carina)

On June 14, a low-pressure area within the monsoonal trough formed east of Hainan, China. On June 16, the low-pressure area started to absorb the surrounding convection from the dissipating monsoonal trough and started to organize, promoting the JMA and the HKO to upgrading the system to a tropical depression later that day. On June 17, the HKO raised the Standby signal, No. 1 as the tropical depression was centered about 470 kilometers from Hong Kong, and the JTWC issued a TCFA on the system. Late on the same day, the JMA upgraded the system to a tropical storm and named it Talim, and the JTWC upgraded Talim to a tropical depression. On June 18, the JTWC upgraded Talim to a tropical storm. On June 19, as the HKO raised the Strong Wind signal, No. 3, moderate vertical wind shear from the north pushed Talim's convection to the south. Later that day, the JMA upgraded Talim to a severe tropical storm, but the JMA downgraded it to a tropical storm early on June 20 as the LLCC fully exposed. Yet, Talim's convection soon wrapped around the center, as it began to merge with a monsoon trough. Later, the PAGASA assigned the local name Carina on the system as it briefly entered the Philippine Area of Responsibility. Late on June 20, both the JMA and the JTWC downgraded Talim to a tropical depression, as the system weakened in the Taiwan Strait. Shortly thereafter, the tropical depression was absorbed into the same monsoon trough which gave birth to Talim. Throughout China, 1 people were killed and total economic losses were counted to be CNY2.25 billion (US$354 million).

Tropical Storm Doksuri (Dindo)

During that day the depression moved north-westwards and consolidated further before during the next day, PAGASA started to monitor it as Tropical Depression Dindo. Later that day, the JMA upgraded the system to a tropical storm and named it Doksuri, and the JTWC upgraded Doksuri to a tropical depression. Late on the same day, the JTWC upgraded Doksuri to a tropical storm. On June 27, Doksuri's low-level circulation center became exposed due to moderate easterly wind shear. On June 28, the JTWC downgraded Doksuri to a tropical depression, as the system's exposed circulation center began to undergo an unusual circulation center replacement cycle, which involves a circulation center to be replaced by another new circulation center. Late on June 29, Doksuri made landfall over Nanshui, Zhuhai, Guangdong, China. During June 30, the JMA reported that Doksuri had weakened into a tropical depression, before reporting that the depression had dissipated later that day. In Macau, the storm caused minor roof damage.

Severe Tropical Storm Khanun (Enteng)

 while in North Korea, state-run media reported that at least seven people were killed in Kangwon Province, with an eighth fatality reported elsewhere. It said the storm caused significant damage, destroying 650 dwelling houses, 30 public buildings, railways, roads, bridges, and various systems. The flooding also inundated nearly 3,870 homes, leaving more than 16,250 people homeless.

On July 29 the North Korean government dramatically raised the death toll in the country to 88, with an additional 134 injured. The biggest loss of human life was in two counties of South Pyongan Province. At least 63,000 were made homeless by the flooding, while more than 30,000 hectares of land for growing crops were submerged and will add to growing fears of another looming famine in the country. Three hundred public buildings and 60 factories were damaged during the storm.

Typhoon Vicente (Ferdie)

Originally Khanun's large area of convention on July 16, the JMA upgraded the system to a tropical depression on July 18. On July 20, the JTWC issued a TCFA on the system; soon, the PAGASA upgraded it to a tropical depression and named it Ferdie. The JTWC also upgraded the system to a tropical depression late on the same day. After the system moved into the South China Sea on July 21, the JMA upgraded the system to a tropical storm and named it Vicente, so did the JTWC.

On July 23, due to weak vertical wind shear and high sea surface temperature, Vicente started to undergo an explosive intensification prompting the JMA to upgrade Vicente to a typhoon, and the JTWC upgraded Vicente to a category 4 typhoon later. At 16:45 UTC, the HKO issued the Hurricane Signal, No. 10, the first since Typhoon York in 1999. Later, Typhoon Vicente made landfall over Taishan in Guangdong, China. Due to land interaction, the JMA downgraded Vicente to a severe tropical storm early on July 24, and the JTWC downgraded Vicente to a category 3 typhoon. Late on the same day, the JMA downgraded Vicente to a tropical depression.

Typhoon Saola (Gener)

Early on July 28, the JTWC upgraded the system to a tropical depression, whilst the JMA upgraded it to a tropical storm and named it Saola. Soon, the PAGASA upgraded the system to a tropical depression and named it Gener. Later that day, the JTWC upgraded Saola to a tropical storm. Early on July 29, the JMA upgraded Saola to a severe tropical storm. On July 30, the JTWC upgraded Saola to a category 1 typhoon, as it started to develop an eye-like feature, but soon downgraded it to a tropical storm late on the same day. Late on July 31, the JMA upgraded Saola to a typhoon. It continued to intensify the next day, reaching its peak intensity as a Category 2 typhoon.

Most forecast models predicts Saola to pass very near on the northern coastline of Taiwan, but this is defied on August 1, when Saola had made landfall on Taiwan as a Category 2 typhoon. It moved slowly inland, making a counter-clockwise loop. It made out to sea, now downgraded as a severe tropical storm. Just then did Saola passed very close to the northern coastline of Taiwan, then it headed straight for China. On August 3 it made landfall near Fuding, Fujian Province as a tropical storm, then headed straight inland until on the next day when Saola dissipated near Jiangxi.

Typhoon Damrey

Originally a cold-core low, the system became a tropical disturbance southwest of Minamitorishima late on July 26. Early on July 27, the Japan Meteorological Agency (JMA) upgraded it to a tropical depression. On July 28, the Joint Typhoon Warning Center (JTWC) issued a Tropical Cyclone Formation Alert on the system, before the JMA upgraded it to a tropical storm and named it Damrey. Late on the same day, the JTWC upgraded Damrey to a tropical depression, and even upgraded it to a tropical storm on the next day. After Damrey had drifted slowly for two days, the JMA upgraded it to a severe tropical storm northeast of Chichi-jima late on July 30, when the storm began to accelerate moving west-northwest and form a banding eye. On August 1, the JTWC upgraded Damrey to a category 1 typhoon, while the system passed through the Ōsumi Islands in Japan, as it started to develop a well defined eye. When Damrey drifted towards Yellow Sea on August 2, the JMA upgraded it to a typhoon. Soon, Typhoon Damrey made landfall over Xiangshui County in Jiangsu, China at 13:30 UTC (21:30 CST).  The system then dissipated near Hebei on August 4.

Typhoon Haikui

Late on July 31, a tropical disturbance formed within a large monsoon trough. On August 1, the Japan Meteorological Agency (JMA) mentioned the system as a tropical depression southeast of Iwo Jima, and the Joint Typhoon Warning Center (JTWC) issued a Tropical Cyclone Formation Alert late on the same day. Late on August 2, the JTWC upgraded it to a tropical depression, before the JMA upgraded the system to a tropical storm and named it Haikui early on the next day. Early on August 4, the JTWC upgraded Haikui to a tropical storm. On August 5, the JMA upgraded Haikui to a severe tropical storm when it was located north-northeast of Kume Island.  Later, Typhoon Haikui made landfall over Xiangshan County in Zhejiang, China at 19:20 UTC (03:20 CST on August 8).

Severe Tropical Storm Kirogi

Over the next day the system gradually developed further, before the JTWC started to monitor the system as Tropical Depression 13W, late on August 4.

On August 5, the JTWC upgraded the system to a tropical storm. Early on August 6, the JMA reported that the system had become extratropical. However, the JMA designated it as a tropical storm with the name Kirogi early on August 8. Early on August 9, the JTWC downgraded Kirogi to a tropical depression. Later, the JMA upgraded Kirogi to a severe tropical storm, it reached its peak intensity, while the JTWC upgraded it to a tropical storm again. Later that day, the JTWC issued its final warning on Kirogi as it transitioned from a warm cored tropical system to a cold cored extratropical system. The remnants of the system then entered the Sea of Okhotsk.

Typhoon Kai-tak (Helen)

The monsoonal trough spawned a tropical disturbance early on August 10, which had organizing convection and a weak circulation. Early on August 12, the Japan Meteorological Agency (JMA) started tracking the system as a weak Tropical Depression with winds under 30 knots. Philippine Atmospheric, Geophysical and Astronomical Services Administration (PAGASA) started issuing advisories on the system, naming it Helen. That day, the JTWC also initiated advisories on Tropical Depression 14W. Early on August 13, the JMA upgraded the depression to Tropical Storm Kai-tak. and 9 hours later the JTWC followed suit. Later the same day, the JMA upgraded it to a Severe Tropical Storm. On August 15, the convection increased as outflow improved, and the JTWC upgraded Kai-tak to a typhoon. The storm continued towards China, with deepening convection due to decreasing wind shear. However, it was only at 0000 UTC on August 16 when the JMA officially declared Kai-tak a typhoon. At the same time, the PAGASA issued their last warning on Kai-tak, otherwise known as Helen, locally, as it left the Philippine area of Responsibility.

On the morning of August 17, Kai-tak made landfall over the Leizhou peninsula in southern China as a typhoon. Within 6 hours, Kai-tak made a second landfall over the northeast coast of Vietnam and weakened slightly to a tropical storm. Later that night, the JTWC issued their final warning on the system as it weakened further and sped up inland. The JMA stopped tracking the storm early the next morning, no longer considering it a tropical cyclone.

Typhoon Tembin (Igme)

On August 16, a tropical disturbance formed southeast of Taiwan. On August 17, the JMA mentioned it as a tropical depression, as a subtropical ridge pushed the system southwards. The JTWC issued a TCFA on the system late on August 18; early on the next day, the JMA upgraded it to a tropical storm and named it Tembin, and the JTWC upgraded it to a tropical depression. Soon, the PAGASA also upgraded it to a tropical depression and named it Igme. On August 20, Tembin entered a period of explosive intensification by excellent dual outflow, prompting both the JMA and the JTWC upgrading it to a typhoon.

On August 22, Tembin began to undergo an eyewall replacement cycle, as it further weakened to a category 1 typhoon. On August 23, Tembin re-intensified into a category 3 typhoon, before it made landfall over Pingtung, Taiwan later on the same day. Due to minor land interaction, the JMA downgraded Tembin to a severe tropical storm early on August 24, and the JTWC downgraded it to a tropical storm later.  Afterward, Typhoon Tembin interacted with the nearby Typhoon Bolaven (Julian). Over the next few days, Tembin made a counterclockwise loop westward, moving back into the Philippine Area of Responsibility (PAR) in the process, causing more rainfall over in the Philippines. Afterward, Tembin weakened into a tropical storm on August 28 and turned north-northeastward. On August 30, Tembin made landfall on South Korea and transitioned into an extratropical storm, before dissipating two days later.

Typhoon Bolaven (Julian)

Forming as a tropical depression on August 19 to the southwest of the Mariana Islands, Bolaven steadily intensified as it slowly moved west-northwestward in a region favoring tropical development. The system was soon upgraded to a tropical storm less than a day after formation and further to a typhoon by August 21. Strengthening became more gradual thereafter as Bolaven grew in size. On August 24, the system attained its peak intensity with winds of 185 km/h (115 mph) and a barometric pressure of 910 mbar (hPa; 26.87 inHg). Weakening only slightly, the storm passed directly over Okinawa on August 26 as it began accelerating toward the north. Steady weakening continued as Bolaven approached the Korean Peninsula and it eventually made landfall in North Korea late on August 28 before transitioning into an extratropical cyclone. The remnants rapidly tracked northeastward and was last noted over the Russian Far East.

Although Bolaven struck the Ryukyu Islands as a powerful typhoon, damage was less than expected. Relatively few buildings were damaged or destroyed across the region. One person drowned on Amami Ōshima after being swept away by a swollen river. In mainland Japan, two people drowned after being swept away by rough seas. In South Korea, 19 people were killed by the storm. Many buildings were damaged and approximately 1.9 million homes were left without power. Losses in the country reached ₩420 billion (US$374.3 million), the majority of which was due to destroyed apple orchards. Significant damage also took place in North Korea where at least 59 people were killed and 50 others were reported missing. Additionally, 6,700 homes were destroyed. Offshore, nine people drowned after two Chinese vessels sank. Total economic losses in China were counted to be CNY 19.82 billion (US$3.126 billion).

Typhoon Sanba (Karen)

A low-pressure area formed east of Palau on September 9. On September 10, both the JMA and the JTWC upgraded it to a tropical depression. As the system entered the PAR early on September 11, the PAGASA named it Karen. At the same time, the JMA upgraded the system to a tropical storm and named it Sanba, and the JTWC also upgraded it to a tropical storm later. 

In Kōchi Prefecture, Japan, 222 hectares (548 acres) of agricultural land was damaged by the storm, with losses reaching ¥50 million (US$640 thousand). Throughout Okinawa, damage to agriculture, forestry, and fisheries amounted to ¥900 million (US$11.5 million).

Typhoon Jelawat (Lawin)

 On September 30, it made landfall on Japan, then on October 1 the system became an extratropical cyclone.

Severe Tropical Storm Ewiniar

Early on September 22, a tropical disturbance formed west of Guam, out of the Intertropical Convergence Zone, and the JMA upgraded it to a tropical depression on the next day. On September 24, the JTWC upgraded the system to a tropical depression, as it became better organized, however the low level circulation center remained exposed, due to outflow wind shear from Jelawat, which pushed the convection to the east of the system, and prevented it from strengthening more quickly. On September 24, the JTWC further upgraded the system to a minimal tropical storm and named it Ewiniar, as the system started moving away from Jelawat, which allowed it to strengthen. On September 27, with the system far from Jelawat's outflow, the exposed low level circulation center was wrapped with convection, and the JMA upgraded the system to a Severe tropical Storm. A small eye-like feature showed up in the satellite image of Ewiniar. On September 29, the system became totally exposed, with the convection being blown away by strong vertical wind shear. It became extratropical the next day.

Severe Tropical Storm Maliksi

On September 27, a large tropical disturbance formed near Chuuk. On September 29, the JMA upgraded the system to a tropical depression. On October 1, the system was upgraded into a tropical storm and named Maliksi. The large storm developed a mid-level circulation center, with microwave satellite imagery showing that the storm had become less organized during the morning hours of October 2 because it had become slightly elongated and on October 3, the JMA upgraded it to Severe Tropical Storm, and the storm's center soon passed over Iwo To. High wind shear and unfavorable conditions made it weaken as it started transitioning to an extratropical system. On October 4, it became fully extratropical, with wind shear from the southwest, which pushed most of the showers and thunderstorms northeast of the center of circulation.

Severe Tropical Storm Gaemi (Marce)

As the tropical depression organized, large, powerful thunderstorms with very cold cloud top temperatures (colder than -63F/-52 C) surrounded the center of circulation, hinting that the storm was organizing and strengthening. The system remained quasi-stationary over the next 12 hours, due to weak steering environment. On October 1, the system strengthened into a tropical storm,

Typhoon Prapiroon (Nina)

As the JMA upgraded the storm to a Severe Tropical Storm on October 8, rapid convection produced a tightly wrapped system with multiple deep convective bands wrapping into a well-defined low level circulation center. On October 9, the JTWC, and the JMA upgraded the system to a typhoon. On  October 11, as the system developed a ragged eye, the JTWC upgraded Prapiroon further, to a category 2 typhoon. The ragged eye soon became well defined as seen in Microwave imagery later that day, and was soon upgraded further to a category 3 typhoon. On October 15, as the system was pushed south, by an anticyclone ridging in from the north, and caused it to make a small cyclonic loop. On October 16, an Anticyclone located on the north west of Prapiroon became slightly displaced to the southeast, which brought wind shear to Prapiroon's northern periphery's convection to be pushed to the south, and caused a strong southern outflow. On October 19, Prapiroon transitioned into an extratropical cyclone, as it became bombarded by strong vertical wind shear. The remnants of Prapiroon's center fully dissipated early on October 23.

Severe Tropical Storm Maria

As it moved westward it strengthened to become Tropical Storm Maria on October 14. Early the next day, the JMA upgraded the Maria into a severe tropical storm.  Early on October 20, the JMA reported that Maria had dissipated.

Typhoon Son-Tinh (Ofel)

On October 19, a tropical disturbance formed southeast of Yap, and the JMA mentioned the system as a tropical depression on October 21. On October 22, the PAGASA started to monitor the tropical depression and named it Ofel. On October 24, the storm made landfall over Leyte and capsized 6 boats in Tacloban City. The storm caused heavy rains and strong winds over the Visayas. At the night of October 24, the storm hardly hit Cebu with rain and winds. Classes in Cebu City were suspended the next day.

Authorities in the Philippines confirmed at least four deaths – an 8-year-old boy who drowned, two men crushed by falling trees, and an elderly man who died from hypothermia. Six fishermen were reported missing, and more than 13,000 passengers were stranded at ferry terminals and ports. Widespread flooding was reported as rivers burst their banks, in some instances rising as much as 12.8 meters in 24 hours. A cargo ship, called the ML Lady RP II, sank with around 1,200 sacks of copra near Zamboanga City at the height of the storm. Strong winds derailed a train in Quezon.

Son-Tinh reached typhoon strength on October 27.

Tropical Depression 25W

Later that day as the system moved towards the north-northwest, the JTWC reported that the disturbance had become a tropical depression before the JMA followed suit early on November 13.

Typhoon Bopha (Pablo)

On November 23, the JTWC reported that a large area of convection  persisted approximately 0.6°N of the equator, or 350 nm south of Pohnpei in the Caroline Islands, and dubbed the system as Invest 90W. Its organization steadily improved over the next few days under a favorable conditions with warm sea surface temperatures. and on November 25 both JTWC and JMA upgraded its status to a Tropical Depression, while the JTWC designated it with 26W. During the early hours of November 26, an upper-level anticyclone formed over the center with near-radial outflow and weak vertical wind shear. Under its influence, 26W strengthened gradually and acquired tropical storm status by that evening. As a result, the JMA officially named the storm Bopha. On November 27, a deep centralized convective cover developed over the LLCC and the JTWC too upgraded Bopha into a tropical storm. By the evening of December 2, the storm entered the Philippine Area of Responsibility and was named Pablo. Late on December 3, as the system continued to strengthen, the system unexpectedly rapidly intensified into a category 5 super typhoon, as the eye started to become well defined at 27 kilometers across. Bopha made landfall as a Category 5 Super Typhoon.  After landfall in Visayas and Mindanao, Bopha weakened to tropical storm as it passed through Palawan island. On December 7 Bopha rapidly re-intensified, going from a Category 1 to a Category 4 in less than 6 hours. The next day it weakened rapidly from a Typhoon to a Tropical Storm due to moderate vertical wind shear. On December 9, the Joint Typhoon Warning Center issued its final advisory. Later that day Bopha weakened into tropical depression and dissipated completely 70 kilometers north of Binabalian, Philippines.

Tropical Storm Wukong (Quinta)

During that day the depressions low level circulation gradually consolidated further, as it moved towards the west-northwest along the southern edge of the subtropical ridge of high pressure. The JTWC and PAGASA subsequently initiated advisories on the system with the latter naming it Quinta. Early on December 25, the JMA reported that the depression had become a tropical storm and named it as Wukong, before reporting that the system had attained its peak 10-minute sustained windspeeds of 75 km/h (45 mph). Later that day, the system passed over or close to several of the Visayan Islands, before the JTWC reported that the system had reached its peak 1-minute sustained windspeeds of 65 km/h (35 mph).

During December 26, Wukong continued to move through the Philippine islands, before the JTWC reported that the system had become a tropical depression, after its low level circulation center became fully exposed within an area of moderate to strong vertical windshear. However, throughout December 27, as the system moved through the South China Sea and deep convection redeveloped over the systems center, the JMA continued to report that Wukong was a tropical storm. During the next day, the JMA reported that the system had weakened into a tropical depression, before the JTWC issued their final warning on Wukong as a north-easterly cold surge along the coast of south-east Asia had caused the depression to become fully exposed.

Within the Philippines, 20 people were killed, while 4 others were left missing.

Other systems
During that day the depression remained near stationary, before the JMA issued their final advisory on the system during the next day as the system dissipated. Over the next day, the depression moved towards the west-northwest, before it was last noted early on April 30, as it dissipated near Mindanao.

Over the next few days the low moved westwards towards the Western Pacific, before it moved into the basin during August 7. As it continued to move towards the west the JMA reported on August 9, that the low had developed into a tropical depression. The system re-entered the Central Pacific Ocean early on August 11. Over the next few days, the depression moved northwards, before it was last noted by the JMA during August 25 moving into North Korea. Over the next couple of days, as the depression moved towards the northwest, the system transitioned into a subtropical cyclone, before it was last noted by the JMA during September 13.

Storm names

Within the North-western Pacific Ocean, both the Japan Meteorological Agency (JMA) and the Philippine Atmospheric, Geophysical and Astronomical Services Administration assign names to tropical cyclones that develop in the Western Pacific, which can result in a tropical cyclone having two names. The Japan Meteorological Agency's RSMC Tokyo — Typhoon Center assigns international names to tropical cyclones on behalf of the World Meteorological Organization's Typhoon Committee, should they be judged to have 10-minute sustained windspeeds of 65 km/h, (40 mph). While the Philippine Atmospheric, Geophysical and Astronomical Services Administration assigns names to tropical cyclones which move into or form as a tropical depression in their area of responsibility located between 135°E and 115°E and between 5°N-25°N even if the cyclone has had an international name assigned to it. The names of significant tropical cyclones are retired, by both PAGASA and the Typhoon Committee. Should the list of names for the Philippine region be exhausted then names will be taken from an auxiliary list of which the first ten are published each season.

International names

The JMA selected the names from a list of 140 names, that had been developed by the 14 members nations and territories of the ESCAP/WMO Typhoon Committee. During the season the names Pakhar, Doksuri, Haikui, Sanba, Maliksi and Son-Tinh were used for the first time, after they had replaced the names Matsa, Nabi, Longwang, Chanchu, Bilis and Saomai, which were retired after the 2005 and 2006 seasons.

After the season the Typhoon Committee retired the names Bopha and Vicente from its naming lists, and in 2014 and 2015, the names were subsequently replaced with Ampil and Lan for future seasons.

Philippines

During the season PAGASA used its own naming scheme for the 17 tropical cyclones, that either developed within or moved into their self-defined area of responsibility. The names were taken from a list of names, that had been last used during 2008 and are scheduled to be used again during 2016. The names Carina and Ferdie were used for the first time during the year after the names Cosme, and Frank were retired. After the season the name Pablo was retired by PAGASA, as it was responsible for over 300 deaths and Php1 billion in damages. It was subsequently replaced on the list with Pepito.

Season effects
This table lists all the storms that developed in the western Pacific Ocean to the west of the International Date Line during the 2012 season. It includes their intensity, duration, name, areas affected deaths, and damages. All damage figures are in 2012 USD. Damages and deaths from a storm include when the storm was a precursor wave, or an extratropical low.

|-
| TD ||  || bgcolor=#| || bgcolor=#| || bgcolor=#| || Malaysia ||  None ||  None ||
|-
| 01W ||  || bgcolor=#| || bgcolor=#| || bgcolor=#| || Philippines ||  ||  ||
|-
| TD ||  || bgcolor=#| || bgcolor=#| || bgcolor=#| || Philippines ||  None ||  None ||
|-
| Pakhar ||  || bgcolor=#| || bgcolor=#| || bgcolor=#| || Philippines, Vietnam, Cambodia, Thailand ||  ||  ||
|-
| TD ||  || bgcolor=#| || bgcolor=#| || bgcolor=#| || None ||  None ||  None ||
|-
| TD ||  || bgcolor=#| || bgcolor=#| || bgcolor=#| || Palau, Philippines ||   None ||  None  ||
|-
| Sanvu ||  || bgcolor=#| || bgcolor=#| || bgcolor=#| || Guam, Marina Islands ||  ||  None ||
|-
| Mawar (Ambo) ||  || bgcolor=#| || bgcolor=#| || bgcolor=#| || Philippines, Japan ||   None ||  ||
|-
| Guchol (Butchoy) ||  || bgcolor=#| || bgcolor=#| || bgcolor=#| || Caroline Islands, Philippines, Japan ||  ||  ||
|-
| Talim (Carina) ||  || bgcolor=#| || bgcolor=#| || bgcolor=#| || China, Taiwan ||  ||  || 
|-
| Doksuri (Dindo) ||  || bgcolor=#| || bgcolor=#| || bgcolor=#| || Philippines, Taiwan, China ||  ||  None ||
|-
| Khanun (Enteng) ||  || bgcolor=#| || bgcolor=#| || bgcolor=#| || Japan, Korea || ||  ||
|-
| Vicente (Ferdie) ||  || bgcolor=#| || bgcolor=#| || bgcolor=#| || Philippines, China, Vietnam, Laos, Burma ||  ||  || 
|-
| Saola (Gener) ||  || bgcolor=#| || bgcolor=#| || bgcolor=#| || Philippines, Taiwan, Japan, China || ||  ||
|-
| Damrey ||  || bgcolor=#| || bgcolor=#| || bgcolor=#| || Japan, China, South Korea ||  ||  || 
|-
| Haikui ||  || bgcolor=#| || bgcolor=#| || bgcolor=#| || Japan, Philippines, China || ||  ||
|-
| Kirogi ||  || bgcolor=#| || bgcolor=#| || bgcolor=#| || Japan ||  None ||  None ||
|-
| TD ||  || bgcolor=#| || bgcolor=#| || bgcolor=#| || None ||  None ||  None ||
|-
| Kai-tak (Helen) ||  || bgcolor=#| || bgcolor=#| || bgcolor=#| || Philippines, China, Vietnam, Laos ||  ||  ||
|-
| Tembin (Igme) ||  || bgcolor=#| || bgcolor=#| || bgcolor=#| || Philippines, Taiwan, China, Japan, South Korea || ||  ||
|-
| Bolaven (Julian) ||  || bgcolor=#| || bgcolor=#| || bgcolor=#| || China, Japan, Korea, Siberia ||  ||  ||
|-
| TD ||  || bgcolor=#| || bgcolor=#| || bgcolor=#| || Korean Peninsula ||  None ||  None ||
|-
| Sanba (Karen) ||  || bgcolor=#| || bgcolor=#| || bgcolor=#| || Palau, Japan, Korea, China, Siberia  ||  ||  ||
|-
| TD ||  || bgcolor=#| || bgcolor=#| || bgcolor=#| || Japan ||  None ||  None ||
|-
| Jelawat (Lawin) ||  || bgcolor=#| || bgcolor=#| || bgcolor=#| || Philippines, Taiwan, Japan ||  ||  ||
|-
| Ewiniar ||  || bgcolor=#| || bgcolor=#| || bgcolor=#| || Mariana Islands, Japan ||  None ||  None ||
|-
| Maliksi ||  || bgcolor=#| || bgcolor=#| || bgcolor=#| || Guam, Marina Islands, Japan ||  None ||  None ||
|-
| Gaemi (Marce) ||  || bgcolor=#| || bgcolor=#| || bgcolor=#| || Philippines, Vietnam, Cambodia, Thailand ||  ||  || 
|-
| Prapiroon (Nina) ||  || bgcolor=#| || bgcolor=#| || bgcolor=#| || Japan ||  None ||  ||
|-
| Maria ||  || bgcolor=#| || bgcolor=#| || bgcolor=#| || Mariana Islands, Japan ||  None ||  None ||
|-
| Son-Tinh (Ofel) ||  || bgcolor=#| || bgcolor=#| || bgcolor=#| || Palau, Philippines, China, Vietnam ||  ||  || 
|-
| 25W ||  || bgcolor=#| || bgcolor=#| || bgcolor=#| || Malaysia, Vietnam ||  None ||  None ||
|-
| Bopha (Pablo) ||  || bgcolor=#| || bgcolor=#| || bgcolor=#| || Caroline Islands, Palau, Philippines || || ||
|-
| Wukong (Quinta) ||  || bgcolor=#| || bgcolor=#| || bgcolor=#| || Philippines, Vietnam ||  ||  20 || 
|-

See also

Tropical cyclones in 2012
 List of Pacific typhoon seasons
 2012 Pacific hurricane season
 2012 Atlantic hurricane season
 2012 North Indian Ocean cyclone season
 South-West Indian Ocean cyclone seasons: 2011–12, 2012–13
 Australian region cyclone seasons: 2011–12, 2012–13
 South Pacific cyclone seasons: 2011–12, 2012–13

Notes

References

External links

 
2012
Articles which contain graphical timelines
2012 WPac